The Orbe-Chavornay railway (O-C) is a 3.9 km standard gauge railway in Vaud, Switzerland, linking the towns of Orbe and Chavornay (where there is an interchange with trains of the Swiss Federal Railways. The line was opened in 1894 and was operated by electric traction from the start - the first electrified standard-gauge railway in Switzerland. The line was initially operated with a direct current overhead power supply 600 Volts and is now 750 Volts.

Since 2001 the line has been operated by the Transports Vallée de Joux - Yverdon-les-Bains - Ste-Croix (TRAVYS).

Modernisation
As of 2017-18 the line is being modernised and upgraded to handle longer trains. The electrification system will be changed to the standard Swiss Federal Railways system of 15 KV alternating current.

Photographs

References 

Railway lines in Switzerland
Railway lines opened in 1894
Transport in the canton of Vaud
750 V DC railway electrification